Reuven Feuerstein (Hebrew: ראובן פוירשטיין; August 21, 1921 – April 29, 2014) was a Romanian-born Israeli clinical, developmental, and cognitive psychologist, known for his theory of intelligence which states “it is not ‘fixed’, but rather modifiable”. Feuerstein is recognized for his work in developing the theories and applied systems of structural cognitive modifiability, mediated learning experience, cognitive map, deficient cognitive functions, learning propensity assessment device, instrumental enrichment programs, and shaping modifying environments. These interlocked practices provide educators with the skills and tools to systematically develop students’ cognitive functions and operations to build meta-cognition.

Feuerstein was the founder and director of the International Center for the Enhancement of Learning Potential (ICELP) in Jerusalem, Israel. For more than 50 years, Feuerstein's theories and applied systems have been implemented in both clinical and classroom settings internationally, with more than 80 countries applying his work. Feuerstein's theory on the malleability of intelligence has led to more than 2,000 scientific research studies and countless case studies with various learning populations (See bibliography and publication on Feuerstein's work).

Biography 

Reuven Feuerstein was one of nine siblings born in Botoșani, Romania. He attended the Teachers College in Bucharest (1940–41) and Onesco College in Bucharest (1942–1944). Feuerstein fled the Nazi invasion before obtaining his degree in psychology. After settling in Mandate Palestine in 1945, he taught child survivors of the Holocaust until 1948. Seeing that these children affected by the Holocaust needed attention, he began a career that attended to the psychological and educational needs of immigrant refugee children.

While attending the University of Geneva, Feuerstein studied under Andre Rey and Jean Piaget. He completed his degrees in both General and Clinical Psychology. During this time there were three main schools of thought, psychoanalysis, behaviorism and Gestalt psychology. He attended lectures given by Karl Jaspers, Carl Jung, Bärbel Inhelder, Marguerite Loosli Uster and Léopold Szondi. In 1970, Feuerstein earned his PhD in developmental psychology at the University of Sorbonne, in France. His major areas of study were Developmental, Clinical, and Cognitive Psychology.

Career and theories
Feuerstein served as Director of Psychological Services of Youth Aliyah in Europe (Immigration for young people), a service that assigned prospective Jewish candidates for emigration from all over the European continent to various educational programs in Israel. In the 1950s he researched Moroccan, Jewish, and Berber children in collaboration with several members of the Genevan school. Upon their arrival, the children were subjected to a series of tests, including IQ tests, achieving poor results that improved whenever Feuerstein interviewed them.

The improvements Feuerstein witnessed in victims after they received extra psychological and educational attention made him question current beliefs regarding the stability of intelligence. "What if intelligence was not a fixed attribute, measurable once and for all? What if intelligence can be taught and was in fact the ability to learn?" (p. 10) Feuerstein elaborated new methods of evaluation as well as new teaching tools, known today as dynamic assessment. education and meeting children's psychological needs in fostering success in school and high intelligence scores. "It was during this period that much of the psychological data was gathered that contributed to my development of concepts of cultural differences and cultural deprivations" Some children who were considered un-teachable were eventually accepted at mainstream schools and learned successfully. This period was also seminal in the development of his working hypothesis concerning low-functioning children and their potential for change.

His interest came from observing the difficulties experienced by the new immigrant students coping with unfamiliar learning environment that he saw as culturally "deprived." He describes culturally "different" children who receive an adequate amount and type of mediated learning experience (MLE) in their native culture and who face the challenges of adapting to a new culture. These children are expected to have good learning potential. On the contrary, culturally "deprived" are those children who were deprived on MLE in their native culture or children who show a reduction in learning potential.

Comparisons have also been made between Feuerstein's theories and those of the Russian psychologist Lev Vygotsky. Vygotsky viewed a child's interaction with the world as mediated by symbolic tools provided by the given culture. Like the social psychologist, Feuerstein gave further insight on cognitive functioning such as logical memory, voluntary attention, categorical perception and self-regulation of behavior. Feuerstein filled a theoretical gap with his theory of Mediated Learning Experience in which he assigns the major role to a human mediator. According to Feuerstein, all learning interactions can be divided into direct learning and mediated learning. Learning mediated by another human being is indispensable for a child because the mediator helps the child develop prerequisites that then make direct learning effective.

The heart of MLE is the theory of structural cognitive modifiability (SCM), which explains the modifiability of deficient cognitive functions. He argued that person's capability to learn is not solely determined by one's genetic make-up; but cognitive enhancement is achieved through mediation. "Cognitive enhancement in SCM refers not merely to the development of specific behavior but also to changes of a 'structural nature'". Feuerstein said he was deeply influenced by Rabbi Menachem Mendel Schneerson, with whom he corresponded, and who would refer patients to him.

Unlike previous developmental psychologists, the focus of Feuerstein's theories is the development of normal versus low functioning children. According to Piaget, it is through the normal child's own natural material actions and problem-solving experiences that mind and intelligence eventually evolve toward the development of logic and abstract thinking. Feuerstein illustrates that the key to meaningful instruction for all children, particularly young and low-functioning children, is the mediated relationship.

The cognitive map 

Another important conceptual tool of the dynamic assessment process is the need to understand the relationship between the characteristics of the task and the performance of the subject. The cognitive map describes the mental act in terms of several parameters that permit an analysis and interpretation of a subject's performance by locating specific problem areas and producing changes in corresponding dimensions. The manipulation of these parameters becomes highly important in the subject-examiner interaction, by helping the examiner to form and validate hypotheses regarding the subject's performance difficulties.

FIE Standard
The FIE Standard program goal is to correct deficiencies in fundamental thinking skills, and to provide students with the concepts, skills, strategies, operations and techniques necessary to function as independent learners. It aims to increase their motivation, meta-cognition. Deliberately free of specific subject matter, the tasks in the instruments are intended to be transferable (bridged) to all educational and everyday life situations. 

To date FIE program has been successfully used across the world in the following frameworks:
 Remedial programs for special needs children.
 Cognitive rehabilitation of brain injured individuals and psychiatric patients.
 Learning enhancement programs for immigrant and cultural minority students.
 Enrichment programs for underachieving, regular and gifted children.
 Professional training and retraining programs in the industrial, military, and business sectors.

Research on the efficacy of this method has been conducted in several samples including engineers at a Motorola (USA) plant, impoverished students in rural communities (Bahia, Brazil), deaf, non-literate immigrants (Ethiopia), Autistic and Down Syndrome children (Jerusalem), low-performing high school math students (Cleveland, Ohio, USA), weak readers in middle grades (Portland, Oregon, USA), and many other groups. FIE was included into the package of educational reform programs recommended by the US Department of Education . Due to its long history and application, FIE Standard is one of the most researched of the cognitive intervention programs, with over one thousand related publications and hundreds of analyses on the performance of FIE in varied settings and populations. FIE is considered suitable for individuals with disabilities and those who are considered “normal” and “gifted”; cognitive gains are seen in all three categories of students who undertake FIE. The program is designed to help people of all ages, not just students.

FIE-BASIC
In 2000, Feuerstein added FIE-BASIC to prevent learning problems in younger children (3 to 8 years old) and to help low performing older children. Feuerstein claims that learning problems may be prevented through early, developmentally appropriate, intervention as well as the emerging brain research. In order to achieve these goals, an emphasis is placed on a systematic exposure of selected and necessary content areas. Specific skills are mediated and transformed into working concepts that build subsequent learning and development and the process of how to think.

The FIE- BASIC program includes a total of 7 instruments taught over 2–4 years depending on the learner's needs and/or the development of implementation. Each focuses on specific cognitive functions that are the pre-requisites to successful school learning, especially in literacy and mathematics. It is designed to be used in a classroom group setting, for smaller groups of targeted learners, and as a one-to-one therapeutic intervention. The use of the FIE-B can be a preparation for the use of the FIE-Standard (mentioned above), taking students to higher levels of mental processing and cognitive functioning.

Projects throughout the State of Alaska Head Start Program (USA), Holly, Michigan (USA) and in Israel, Britain, Italy, India, and Japan are exploring the applications of the Basic instruments with young children and students with special needs, especially as a way to avoid the over-categorization of students as learning disabled.

Quotes 

In 1976, four years before the publication of the first edition of Instrumental Enrichment, the Record, a journal of the NIH-US Department of Health, Education and Welfare, described the "exciting, highly imaginative project by Dr. Feuerstein" then being funded by the National Institute of Child Health and Human Development for showing that "intervention –even in adolescents – is not too late."

NICHD Scientists Prediction– “The program (Instrumental Enrichment) holds great promise for improving learning skills of millions of mildly retarded, culturally disadvantaged adolescents in our school systems and for the more precise identification and placement of children based upon what they can learn rather than what have learned.” (From N.I.H. Record, September 21, 1976, Vol. XXVIII, no. 19)

Michael, J. Begab, Head of the Mental Retardation Research Center of The NICHD, (1980) – “Feuerstein has introduced a determinate of cognitive development that is not part of Piagetian theory and more importantly has converted a descriptive system into a instructional and operational one. The author has achieved this very difficult goal through an unusual blend of talents: clinical acumen and insight of the highest order; a wealth of experience with troubled and handicapped children and youth from diverse cultures; a gift for conceptualization and integration of theory; ingenuity; resourcefulness and open mindfulness; and above all, total commitment to the worth and dignity of all human beings and to their capacity for positive change. Feuerstein has spectacularly bridged the gap from research to practice and provided educators with effective tools for improving the performance of children with a range of learning deficits.” (From Instrumental Erichment (1980)Version)

"Reuven Feuerstein is one of a handful of educational thinkers and practitioners who has made a significant, lasting contribution to our understanding of human learning.” —Howard Gardner, Harvard Graduate School of Education

"A highly innovative and immensely hope-inspiring work. . . . —From the Foreword by John D. Bransford, University of Washington, College of Education

Awards and recognition
1986, Detroit Public Schools, Special Commendation
1990, Médaille d'Or of Aix-les-Bains, France
1990, Médaille d'Or of Nevers, France
1991, Variety Clubs International Humanitarian Award, Vancouver, Canada
1991, Chevalier dans l'Ordre des Palmes Académiques, France
1991, Yakir Yerushalaim (Distinguished Citizen of Jerusalem)
1992, New York Academy of Sciences
1992, Israel Prize, for social sciences.
1997, Honor al estudio y la investigacion en el campo de la formación professional. National Organization for Professional Training. Valencia, Spain.
1997, Special Resolution of Commendation, Assembly, State of California, USA
1998, Miembro de honor; Universidad Diego Portales, Chile
1999, Doctorate Honoris Causa, University of Turin, Italy
2009, Doctorate Honoris Causa, Babeș-Bolyai University, Cluj-Napoca, Romania

See also 
 List of Israel Prize recipients

References

External links
"Reuven Feuerstein - The Man, Method, and Applications"
"Reuven Feuerstein Books and Feuerstein Instrumental Enrichment Student Materials"
"Teaching and Learning Intelligence"
"Feuerstein's Instrumental Enrichment (FIE) as a Model for School Reform" by Mier Ben-Hur, International Renewal Institute
"Feuerstein's Instrumental Enrichment Basic" by Meir Ben-Hur, International Renewal Institute
"An Educational Pioneer Who Proved that All Students Can Learn How to Learn In Spite of Their Impulsive Behavior, Disconnected Thinking, and Low Motivation"
"Quality in Education According to the Teachings of Deming and Feuerstein" by Myron Tribus
"Letters from Jerusalem" Myron Tribus diary of attendance at Mediated Learning sessions
"The Application of the Structural Cognitive Modifiability Theory with Learners with Down's Syndrome in an Educational Framework" by Israela Even-Chen

"Teaching Intelligence"
"Reuven Feuerstein: A Man For Peace"
"Advocate for the Mute"- by Aharon Feuerstein, Makor Rishon

Bibliography

Israeli educators
Romanian emigrants to Mandatory Palestine
Israeli expatriates in France
Israeli expatriates in Switzerland
Romanian Jews
University of Geneva alumni
University of Paris alumni
Israel Prize in social sciences recipients
People from Botoșani
Recipients of the Presidential Medal of Distinction of Israel
1921 births
2014 deaths
Jews who emigrated to escape Nazism